Discocheilus is a genus of cyprinid fishes endemic to China. This genus contains two recognized species.

Species
 Discocheilus multilepis (D. Z. Wang & D. J. Li, 1994)
 Discocheilus wui (J. X. Chen & J. H. Lan, 1992)

References

 

 
Cyprinidae genera
Cyprinid fish of Asia
Freshwater fish of China